Kalix Bandyförening, is a bandy club from Kalix, Sweden, founded on 2 May 1990. The club has been playing in the top-tier of Swedish bandy, Elitserien, in the 2011–12 season and then again since the 2013–14 season.

Supporters of the club often just call the club KB. The club was founded as Kalix Nyborg BK, by fusioning the bandy departments of the clubs Nyborgs SK and IFK Kalix. The name "Kalix BF" was adopted on 20 June 2001. Nyborgs SK has later started a new bandy department of its own.

References

External links
 Official website

 
Bandy clubs in Sweden
Bandy clubs established in 1990
1990 establishments in Sweden
Sport in Norrbotten County
Kalix